Marlon Smith (born September 9, 1989) is an American gridiron football defensive lineman who is currently a free agent. He played for three seasons in the Canadian Football League (CFL) for the Ottawa RedBlacks from 2014–2016.

References

1989 births
Living people
American players of Canadian football
Ottawa Redblacks players
San Antonio Commanders players
Players of American football from San Antonio
Players of Canadian football from San Antonio
Basketball players from San Antonio
St. Mary's Rattlers men's basketball players
UTSA Roadrunners football players
American men's basketball players
Canadian football defensive linemen